Augusto Zucchi (born 9 March 1946) is an Italian actor and theatre director. He appeared in more than seventy films since 1970.

Selected filmography

References

External links 

1946 births
Living people
Italian male film actors
Italian theatre directors
People from the Province of Savona